This is a list of former municipalities of Nova Scotia, the type of municipality, the new municipality, whether the merger was by amalgamation or dissolution or annexation, and the year they joined the new municipality, if known. Unincorporated areas that joined municipalities are mentioned as well, if known. Explanations on the basis of the amalgamations are given wherever possible.

Nova Scotia has undergone reforms to local government since the mid-1990s, which has seen various municipalities amalgamate to form larger municipalities or dissolve into surrounding municipalities.

References 

Lists of historic places in Nova Scotia